Émilie Loit was the defending champion, but did not compete this year.

Lucie Šafářová won the title by defeating Li Na 6–7(4–7), 6–4, 6–3 in the final.

Seeds

Draw

Finals

Top half

Bottom half

References
 Main and Qualifying Draws (WTA)

2005 Estoril Open